Luisana Melo is a Venezuelan politician who is currently Minister of Health in the Cabinet of Venezuela.

References

Year of birth missing (living people)
Living people
Women government ministers of Venezuela
United Socialist Party of Venezuela politicians
Central University of Venezuela alumni
Health ministers of Venezuela